Bamanga Tukur (CON) (born 15 September 1935) is a Nigerian businessman and politician who served as Minister for Industries in the administration of General Sani Abacha during the 1990s. He is one of the high-profile civil servants and military officers who acquired large areas of farmland along the various River Basin authorities. He is currently life patron of ABR. He was president of the Africa Business Roundtable in 2012. From March 2012 to January 2014, Tukur was National Chairman of the People's Democratic Party (PDP).

Life and career
Bamanga Tukur is a resident of Adamawa State and was once the governor of the old Gongola State, which encompassed Adamawa and Taraba States. He was also a member of the board of Trustees of the People's Democratic Party (PDP). He came to national attention in the mid-1970s, as the general manager of the Nigerian Ports Authority, it was a time the agency was having problems with congestion as a result of a massive cement importation scheme that was started at the twilight of Yakubu Gowon's administration. During his tenure, the government built a few more seaports to ease the transaction cost associated with shipping and to ensure adequate facilities for Nigeria's import and export needs.

In 1982, he left his position as general manager and soon contested the Gongola gubernatorial race, which he won. Tukur served as governor for three months before the democratic administration was curtailed by a military coup. After leaving the Gongola State House, he entered full scale entrepreneurship, and was the founder and chairman of BHI holdings (DADDO group of companies). In 1992, he was an unsuccessful presidential candidate for the National Republican Convention, during which he and a few rivals of Adamu Ciroma lobbied for the cancellation of the first primary due to allegations of favouritism levelled against the leadership of the party.

Bamanga Tukur serves as the Chair of NEPAD Business Group and Executive President of African Business Roundtable (ABR). From 1975 to 1982, Tukur served as Chief Executive of the Nigerian Ports Authority. In 1983, he was elected civilian Governor of Gongola State (now Adamawa State). From 1993 to 1995, he served as a member of the Federal Executive Council and Minister of Industry of Nigeria. He is Honorary Life President of the west and central Africa Ports Management Association, and a member of various Chambers of Commerce in Nigeria. He is a member of the UNIDO International Business Advisory Council, the Ghana Investors Advisory Council and the OECD Africa Investment Advisory Board. He was elected Chairman of the NEPAD Business Group in March 2002. Dr. Tukur serves as Chairman of Advisory Board at Africa investor Ltd. and also serves as chairman of the board at African Investment Advisory. Dr. Tukur was awarded the Doctorate Degree of Law (Honoris Causa) by Benue State University, Makurdi, Nigeria and is a fellow of the Nigerian Institute of Transport Technology, Zaria. He also has an MSc from the University of Pittsburgh He was awarded the National Honour of the Commander of the Order of the Mono (COM), and the National Honour of the Commander of the Order of the Niger (CON) in recognition of his contribution to business in Africa. He holds the traditional title of Tafidan Adamawa and Wakilin Ganye in Adamawa State.

With the support of President Goodluck Jonathan, Tukur was elected as National Chairman of the PDP, Nigeria's governing party, in March 2012.

Faction within his party

On 31 August 2013, the chairmanship of Bamanga was openly challenged when seven governors, including Nyako from Adamawa state, 22 senators and 57 members of House Representatives, all from the PDP, were led by former Vice-President Atiku Abubakar to declare a 'New PDP' with Alhaji Abubakar Kawu Baraje as its chairman.
The governors were:
Murtala Nyako from Adamawa State,
Sule Lamido of Jigawa State,
Rabiu Kwankwaso of Kano State,
Abdulfatah Ahmed of Kwara State,
Mu'azu Babangida Aliyu of Niger State,
Chibuike Amaechi of Rivers State and
Aliyu Magatakarda Wamakko of Sokoto State.

On 15 January 2014, Bamanga Tukur resigned as Chairman of the PDP. Tukur had insisted that he would not resign, saying that it was only the party's convention that could remove him, but he was said to have been pressured to resign by his son, Anwal.

References

William Reno, Warlord politics and African states, Lynne Rienner Publishers; (July 1999). 

Living people
1935 births
Governors of Gongola State
Nigerian businesspeople
Nigerian Muslims
People from Adamawa State
National Working Committee chairs